is a Japanese professional golfer.

Hamano played on the Japan Golf Tour, winning twice.

Professional wins (2)

Japan Golf Tour wins (2)

External links

Japanese male golfers
Japan Golf Tour golfers
Sportspeople from Fukuoka Prefecture
1957 births
Living people